Matulović is a Serbo-Croatian surname, a patronymic derived from the archaic Slavic given name Matul. It may refer to:

Marina Matulović-Dropulić (born 1942), Croatian politician
Milan Matulović, Serbian chess player

References

Serbian surnames
Croatian surnames